VolTra is a voluntary non-governmental organization, registered as a charitable institution in Hong Kong. VolTra is dedicated to promoting international voluntary services in Hong Kong through a well-established worldwide network of international workcamp organizations. VolTra is an official member of CCIVS, which stands for Co-ordinating Committee for International Voluntary Service.

Operations

VolTra together with other international workcamp organizations all over the world provide over 3,000 international workcamps and voluntary service projects every year in more than 100 countries. At the same time, VolTra also organizes international workcamps in Hong Kong for both local and overseas volunteers to participate in the voluntary services and cultural exchange activities in Hong Kong.

References

Organisations based in Hong Kong